The WAGR Pm and Pmr classes were two classes of 4-6-2 tender engine steam locomotives operated by the Western Australian Government Railways (WAGR) between 1950 and the early 1970s.

History
With the WAGR suffering from a shortage of locomotives and having a backlog of repairs deferred from World War II, authorisation was granted for the construction of 35 4-6-2 locomotives. Initially it was planned that Midland Railway Workshops build 10 with the balance built externally. However capacity constraints at Midland saw the order for the full 35 placed with the North British Locomotive Company, Glasgow.

Nineteen were built as the Pm class with plain bearings on the coupled axles and roller bearings on the carrying axles. The other sixteen were built as the Pmr class with roller bearings on all axles. One Pm was later converted to a Pmr at Midland Railway Workshops.

All entered service in 1950. Although intended to operate passenger services, their independently sprung driving wheels gave a rough ride meaning they could not maintain schedules, hence they were quickly relegated to fast freight trains on the Eastern Goldfields and Great Southern lines and associated branches. Later they were concentrated on the Great Southern and South Western lines. All were withdrawn between 1970 and 1972.

Classes list

The numbers and periods in service of each member of the Pm and Pmr classes were as follows:

See also

Rail transport in Western Australia
List of Western Australian locomotive classes

References

Notes

Bibliography

External links

NBL locomotives
Railway locomotives introduced in 1950
Pm WAGR and Pmr classes
3 ft 6 in gauge locomotives of Australia
4-6-2 locomotives
Passenger locomotives